Cool 101.5 (DWEJ 101.5 MHz) is an FM station owned and operated by UBC Media (Love Radio Network). Its studios and transmitter are located at Lucena.

References

External links
Cool 101.5 FB Page

Radio stations in Lucena, Philippines
Radio stations established in 2019